The International Society for the Study of Medieval Latin Culture (known as SISMEL) is an Italian non-profit cultural institute, based in Florence. It promotes multi-disciplinary research into the history, art, literature and philology of the medieval Latin era.

Structure
SISMEL was founded by Claudio Leonardi in 1978, formally recognized in 1984 and was approved as a Superior Graduate School by the Ministero per i Beni e le Attività Culturali in 1997.

In December 2012 SISMEL inaugurated the premises of the new headquarters, in a portion of a historic building, built in 1873 and located in the center of Florence in Via Montebello n. 7, between the train station of Santa Maria Novella and the river Arno. All activities of SISMEL were transferred here in 2013 from the former Carthusian monastery of Certosa di Firenze, which was the first base of the Society.

In the same building of Via Montebello there is also the Ezio Franceschini Foundation, with which SISMEL has shared the premises of the Certosa for 25 years.

Publishing
The Society runs the academic publishing house SISMEL-Edizioni del Galluzzo, specializing in editions of medieval literature and related subjects. It also publishes seven research periodicals:
 Documenti e studi sulla Tradizione filosofica medievale
 Filologia Mediolatina
 Hagiographica
 Iconographica
 Itineraria
 Micrologus
 Stilistica e Metrica Italiana

Other projects
SISMEL is a partner in the project to digitalize the manuscripts of the  Biblioteca Medicea Laurenziana in Florence, and in "MIRABILE", a knowledge management system for researching medieval culture.

See also

 Agostino Paravicini Bagliani
 Fondazione Ezio Franceschini (FEF)

References

Further reading
 Emiliano Degl'Innocenti and Sabina Magrini, "Digitizing Cultural Heritage: the Digital Library of the Biblioteca Medicea Laurenziana" in Electronic imaging & the visual arts. Eva 2009 Florence. Proceedings. Vito Cappellini, James Hemsley (eds). Bologna: Pitagora Editrice, 2009 (pp. 58–63).

External links
 
 SISMEL at DGBIC (it)

Cultural organisations based in Italy
Education in Florence
Italian publishers (people)
Medieval Latin literature
Philology